Stubbs is an unincorporated community in Platte County, in the U.S. state of Missouri.  It lies within the Kansas City metropolitan area.

History
A variant name was "Stubbs Station". The community has the name of Robert Stubbs, the original owner of the site.

References

Unincorporated communities in Platte County, Missouri
Unincorporated communities in Missouri